Quintana may refer to:

People
Quintana is a Spanish surname, associated with:
Alfredo Quintana (1988–2021), Portuguese handballer
Andrés Quintana Roo  (1787–1851), Mexican politician
Anton Quintana (1937–2017), Dutch writer
Anxo Quintana (born 1959), Spanish politician
Quintana Olleros (1851–1919, born Blas Olleros y Quintana), Spanish painter
Charlie Quintana (1962–2018), US musician
Carlos Quintana (disambiguation)
Carlos Quintana (boxer) (born 1976), Puerto Rican boxer
Carlos Morales Quintana (born 1970), Spanish architect and yachtsman, husband of Princess Alexia of Greece and Denmark
Carlos Quintana (baseball) (born 1965), Major League Baseball player 
Carlos Quintana (footballer) (born 1988), Argentine football defender
Dayer Quintana (born 1992), Colombian professional road bicyclist
Diego Quintana (born 1978), Argentine footballer
Dionisio Quintana (born 1957), Cuban javelin thrower
Gretchen Quintana (born 1984), Cuban heptathlete
Enrique Quintana
Enrique Fuentes Quintana (1924–2007), Spanish politician
Ismael Quintana (1937–2016), Puerto Rican singer
Janelle Quintana (born 1989), Filipina actress
José Quintana (born 1989), Major League Baseball player
Changuito (born 1948; as José Luís Quintana), Cuban percussionist
José Luis Naranjo y Quintana (born 1944), Mexican politician
Juan de Quintana (died 1534), Franciscan friar and confessor to the Holy Roman Emperor
Juan Cortada y Quintana (1821–1889), Puerto Rican politician
Leona Vicario (1789–1842; as Leona Vicario de Quintana Roo), Mexican independentist rebel
Lope Conchillos y Quintana (died 1521), Spanish politician
Manuel José Quintana (1772–1857), Spanish writer
Mário Quintana (1906–1994), Brazilian writer
Nairo Quintana (born 1990), Colombian racing cyclist
Rosa Quintana (born 1959), Spanish civil servant and politician
Sebastián Quintana (born 1983), Uruguayan/Qatari footballer
Francisco J. Quintana (born 1974), American-Argentinean neuroscientist

Characters 
Jesus Quintana, a character in the films The Big Lebowski and The Jesus Rolls, portrayed by John Turturro
Dante Quintana, the main character from the book Aristotle and Dante Discover the Secrets of the Universe, by Benjamin Alire Sáenz

Places

Geographic features 
Quintana Island, an Antarctic island

Settlements, and administrative and political divisions
Quintana Municipality in São Paulo, Brazil
Quintana, Texas, United States
Quintana (Hato Rey), a sector in Puerto Rico
Quintana (Belmonte), a parish in Asturias, Spain
Quintana (Bernedo), a council area in the Basque Country in Spain
Quintana (Madrid), a ward in Madrid, Spain
Quintana de la Serena, municipality in Spain
Quintana Roo, a state in Mexico
Quintana y Congosto, a municipality in Spain
Villarta-Quintana, a municipality in Spain

Structures and sites 
Estadio Quintana Roo, a football stadium in Quintana Roo
La Quintana, a library park in Medellin, Colombia
Quintana (Madrid Metro), a station on Line 5

Sports
Quintana Roo Tigres, a Mexican baseball team
Academia Quintana, a Puerto Rican football team
Quintana Roo (company), a company that produces time trial bicycles mainly for triathlons

Biology
Quintana atrizona, a Cuban fish species in the monotypic genus Quintana
Bartonella quintana, or Rochalimaea quintana, a bacterium that causes trench fever

Other uses
 Quintana Roo Speleological Survey of Quintana Roo, Mexico
 Operation Quintana Roo, Mexican anti-narcotics military operation
 Giostra della Quintana, a historical jousting tournament in Foligno, Italy

See also

Spanish-language surnames